Megha Burman is an Indian actress working in Hindi and Tamil film industry.

She played the role of Razia in Sohan Roy's Dam, which may have been based on the Mullaperiyar Dam dispute between Tamil Nadu and Kerala. The DMK party chief M. Karunanidhi urged the Tamil Nadu chief minister J.Jayalalitha to ban the movie for "people's safety". A day before its scheduled release on 25 November, the film was banned by the State Government on grounds that its release would disturb relations between Tamil Nadu and Kerala.

She played the lead role in Oru Modhal Oru Kadhal. Her film Ballad of Rustom was a qualifying feature for the Academy Awards in 2014. In 2020, she played the role of Nisha Das in the Hindi language sports drama film Panga.

Filmography

References

External links
 

Living people
Year of birth missing (living people)
Actresses in Tamil cinema
Actresses in Telugu cinema